The main Bulgarian celebration events are :
 Martenitsa, all of March, beginning with the 1st of march
 Nestinari
 Kukeri
 Koleda (Christmas), Koledari
 Velikden (Easter)
 Name Days
 International Mother's Day, March 8 
 Independence Day, March 3
 Sveti, Sveti Kiril i Metodii, May 24

Other Bulgarian customs, specific for Bulgaria, worship God, the saints, the nature, the health, and chase away bad spirits :
 St. Andrew's Day - 30 November
 Antonovden - 17 January
 Archangelden - 8 November
 Christmas Eve
 Budnik
 Easter
 Valtchi praznici
 St George's Day
 German
 Dragon chasing
 Gorestnici - 28,29,30 July
 Dimitrovden - 26 October
 St John's Eve - 24 June
 Need-fire
 Trifon Zarezan  - 1 February / 14 February
 Horse riding Todorovden - 1st Saturday of Lent
 Feast of the Cross - 14 September
 Lazarice (Lazarus Saturday) - 8 days before Easter in the name of Lazarus
 Maccabees - ab 1 August for 12 days, to remember the Maccabees
 Mratinci - Chasing of bad spirits, 14 November
 Nestinarstvo - Fire dance
 Nikulden - 6 December
 Pali Kosh - 2 March - circle dances around a Campfire
 Dodola
 Petliovden - 20 January - Praying for a better harvest
 Rusalska sedmica - Dance procession like Exorcism, one week after Pentecost
 Sirni zagovezni - On Sunday, seven weeks before Easter.  Jumping over the campfire and juggling with fire
 Surva (Beginning of the new year), Kukeri (At the beginning of the new year and on Sirni zagovezni) and Koledari (on Christmas),
 Todorova nedelja - The period between Sirni zagovezni and Todorovden
 Dogs swinging - The first Monday of the period Todorova nedelja
 Throwing willow branches into water spring on Pentecost
 Throwing wood crosses into water spring  on Iordanovden, the 6th of January to remember the Baptism of Jesus
 Survakane

Literature 
 Българска народна митология. Енциклопедичен речник. Съст. Анани Стойнев. Изд. гр. 7М+Логис, София, 1994.
 Маринов Димитър Народна вяра и религиозни народни обичаи. Второ фототипно издание. — София, 1994.
 Маринов Д. Жива старина. Книга перва: Верванията или суеверията на народа. — Руссе, 1891. 189 с.

References

External links
Small booklet about Bulgarian customs, traditions and celebrations Free PDF booklet by Bulgaria Info-Online Magazine
Българските традиции
Оrenda-bg.net